A Buffalo wing in American cuisine is an unbreaded chicken wing section (flap or drumette) that is generally deep-fried and then coated or dipped in a sauce consisting of a vinegar-based cayenne pepper hot sauce and melted butter prior to serving. They are traditionally served hot, along with celery sticks and carrot sticks with blue cheese dressing or, primarily outside of New York, ranch dressing for dipping. Buffalo wings are named for Buffalo, New York, where they were invented, and have no relation to the animal. They are often called simply wings, hot wings, or chicken wings.

Buffalo wings have gained in popularity in the United States and abroad, with some North American restaurant chains featuring them as a main menu item. The name "Buffalo" is now also applied to other spiced fried foods served with dipping sauces, including boneless chicken wings (made from chicken breast meat rather than a chicken wing), chicken fries, chicken nuggets, popcorn chicken, shrimp, and cauliflower. It is also used for other dishes, such as pizza, that are seasoned with the Buffalo-style sauce or a Buffalo flavor seasoning.

History

Origin
There are several different claims about the invention of Buffalo wings. One of the claims is that Buffalo wings were first prepared at the Anchor Bar in Buffalo, New York, by Teresa Bellissimo, who owned the bar with husband Frank in 1964. At the time, chicken wings were inexpensive and undesirable, and normally thrown away or reserved for stock or soup.

Several versions of the story of the invention of the Buffalo wing have been circulated by the Bellissimo family and others including:

Upon the unannounced, late-night arrival of their son, Dominic, with several of his friends from college, Teresa needed a fast and easy snack to present to her guests. It was then that she came up with the idea of deep frying chicken wings  and tossing them in cayenne hot sauce.
Dominic Bellissimo (Frank and Teresa's son) told The New Yorker reporter Calvin Trillin in 1980: "It was Friday night in the bar and since people were buying a lot of drinks he wanted to do something nice for them at midnight when the mostly Catholic patrons would be able to eat meat again." He stated his mother came up with the idea of chicken wings.
There was mis-delivery of wings instead of backs and necks for making the bar's spaghetti sauce. Faced with this unexpected resource, Frank Bellissimo says that he asked Teresa to do something with them.

Although an article published about the Anchor Bar in a local newspaper during 1969 does not mention Buffalo wings, a local competitor of the Anchor Bar, Duff's, began selling Buffalo wings in that year.

Another claim is that John Young, who moved to Buffalo  from Alabama in 1948, began serving uncut chicken wings that were breaded, deep fried and served in his own special tomato based "Mambo sauce" at his Buffalo restaurant, beginning in 1961. Prior to opening his restaurant he had a conversation with a boxer who traveled and in a later interview Young recalled: "He told me that there was a restaurant in Washington, D.C. that was doing a good business with wings and I decided to specialize". In the same interview Young stated that the Anchor Bar didn't offer Buffalo wings as a regular menu item until 1974. He registered the name of his restaurant, John Young's Wings 'n Things, at the county courthouse before leaving the Buffalo area in 1970. In 2013, at the National Buffalo Wing Festival, held in Buffalo, New York, John Young's contributions were acknowledged when he was inducted into the festival's National Buffalo Wing Hall of Flame.

Growth and popularity

In 1977, the city of Buffalo issued an official proclamation celebrating Anchor Bar co-owner Frank Bellissimo and declared July 29, 1977, to be Chicken Wing Day. Throughout the 1970s and 1980s Buffalo wings gained in popularity as a bar food and appetizer across the United States and Canada. Large franchises specializing in Buffalo wings have emerged, notably Buffalo Wild Wings founded in 1982 and Hooters in 1983. McDonald's began selling Mighty Wings as an option in 1990 at their restaurant locations in the United States. In 1994, following four Super Bowl appearances by the Buffalo Bills football team, the Domino's pizza chain added Buffalo wings to their national menu, followed by Pizza Hut the next year.

As the market for chicken wings expanded, restaurants began to create and use a variety of sauces in addition to buffalo sauce. Some of these new chicken wing sauces were influenced by Chinese, Japanese, Thai, Caribbean, and Indian cuisines. Other flavors created by restaurants include unique combinations, such as Blueberry BBQ Wing Sauce and Maple/Bacon Glaze for example, to help keep customer interest and grow their businesses. After the price of raw wings increased, and with a growing desire by some diners for a neater eating experience, restaurants began to offer a menu item called "boneless wings," sometimes marketed under the name wyngz. Boneless wings are essentially small pieces of skinless, boneless chicken breast that are coated in flour and spices, then fried or baked, like a chicken nugget. They are usually coated in or served with the same sauces as Buffalo wings. The growing popularity in recent years of Buffalo wing consumption, and of restaurants serving wings, have led to actual and perceived shortages of chicken wings in the United States during certain times.

In many areas of the United States, chicken wing festivals are held—with Buffalo wings being used in competitive eating events such as at Philadelphia's Wing Bowl and the National Buffalo Wing Festival. It has also become commonplace for restaurants to offer a wing-eating contest. Many bars and restaurants intentionally create an extra-hot sauce for this purpose, and customers are sometimes rewarded with their picture posted on the restaurant's wall or website, a commemorative T-shirt, a free meal or a combination of rewards for successfully completing the challenge.

Preparation

Chicken
The chicken wings used for Buffalo wings are usually segmented into three parts: drumette, flat, and flapper or pointer, the last of which is usually discarded, although some restaurants serve them with this latter part still connected to the flat. Traditionally, the wings are deep-fried in oil, without breading or flour until they are well browned. Alternatively, they may be baked, grilled, or broiled.

Sauce
Cayenne pepper-based hot sauce, melted butter, and vinegar are the standard base of Buffalo wing sauce, which may be made mild, medium, or hot. Other ingredients are also common, although less dominant, such as Worcestershire sauce and garlic powder. Commercial ready-to-use wing sauce is made with varying levels of spiciness. The cooked chicken wings are placed in a bowl or pot and shaken to coat the wings completely covering them in sauce before serving.

Service

Traditionally, Buffalo wings are served with small sticks of celery (accompanied sometimes with baby carrots or carrot sticks), and blue cheese dipping sauce on the side. Ranch dressing, however, is the most popular wing dipping sauce in the United States. These sides act not only as a dip but as cooling elements for those eating particularly spicy wings, due to the fat content of the dips acting as a solvent and taking away the hydrophobic capsaicin when swallowing, which would otherwise cling to the tongue and maintain the burning sensation.

See also
 
 Chicken lollipop
 List of hors d'oeuvre
 List of regional dishes of the United States
 Swiss wing
 Italian-American cuisine

References

External links

 National Buffalo Wing Festival
 The First Buffalo Chicken Wings by The Buffalo History Museum. Discusses 19th century consumption of chicken wings in Buffalo, N.Y.

American chicken dishes
Appetizers
Canadian cuisine
Cuisine of New York (state)
Cuisine of the Mid-Atlantic states
Cuisine of the Midwestern United States
Culture of Buffalo, New York
Fried chicken